The 1976–77 WCHL season was the 11th season for the Western Canada Hockey League. Twelve teams completed a 72-game season.  The New Westminster Bruins won their third consecutive President's Cup as well as the Memorial Cup.

League notes
The Edmonton Oil Kings relocated to Portland, Oregon to become the Portland Winter Hawks, the first United States based team in the WCHL.
The Winnipeg Clubs became the Winnipeg Monarchs.
The WCHL split into three divisions of four teams each.

Regular season

Final standings

Scoring leaders
Note: GP = Games played; G = Goals; A = Assists; Pts = Points; PIM = Penalties in minutes

1977 WCHL Playoffs

Preliminary round
Calgary defeated Medicine Hat 4 games to 0
Lethbridge defeated Saskatoon 4 games to 2

League quarter-finals
Brandon defeated Winnipeg 5 games to 2
Lethbridge defeated Calgary 3 games to 2
New Westminster defeated Victoria 4 games to 0
Portland defeated Kamloops 4 games to 1

League semi-finals
Brandon defeated Lethbridge 4 games to 0
New Westminster defeated Portland 4 games to 1

WHL Championship
New Westminster defeated Brandon 4 games to 1

All-Star game

On January 19, the West All-Stars defeated the East All-Stars 3–2 at Brandon, Manitoba with a crowd of 4,120.

WHL awards

All-Star Teams

See also
1977 Memorial Cup
1977 NHL Entry Draft
1976 in sports
1977 in sports

References
whl.ca
 2005–06 WHL Guide

Western Hockey League seasons
WHL
WCHL